The Vanuatu national under-17 football team is the national U-17 team of Vanuatu and is controlled by the Vanuatu Football Federation.

History

The Vanuatu national under-17 football team has currently taken part in the tournament 15 times (1989, 1993, 1995, 1997, 1999, 2001, 2003, 2005, 2009, 2011, 2013, 2015, 2017, 2018 & 2023). Their best result was in 2005 when the team reached the final, but they lost it against Australia. During the 2015 Tournament, Sylvain Worworbu scored 11 goals. After this tournament, both top scorer Sylvain Worworbu and captain Joseph Iaruel got a scholarship for two years at St Peter's College. This was the first time that a Vanuatu player got a scholarship.

Competition Record

FIFA U-17 World Cup record

OFC U-17 Championship record
The OFC U-17 Championship is a tournament held once every two years to decide the only two qualification spots for the Oceania Football Confederation (OFC) and its representatives at the FIFA U-17 World Cup.

Current squad
The following players were called up for the 2018 OFC U-16 Championship from 9 to 22 September 2018.

Caps and goals as of 15 September 2018 after the game against Solomon Islands.

2017 squad
The following players were called up for the 2017 OFC U-17 Championship from 11 to 24 February 2017.

Caps and goals as of 17 February 2017 after the game against New Caledonia.

Squad for the 2015 OFC U-17 Championship

Caps and goals as of 27 January 2015.

|-

! colspan="9"  style="background:#b0d3fb; text-align:left;"|
|- style="background:#dfedfd;"

|-

! colspan="9"  style="background:#b0d3fb; text-align:left;"|
|- style="background:#dfedfd;"

|-
! colspan="9"  style="background:#b0d3fb; text-align:left;"|
|- style="background:#dfedfd;"

Results and Fixtures

2013

2015

2017

2018

List of coaches
  Wilson August (2010-2011)
  Etienne Mermer (2012-2016)
  Rocky Neveserveth (2016-)

References

External links
 Vanuatu Football Federation official website

under-17
Oceanian national under-17 association football teams